Solitude Farm is a historic home in West Whiteland Township, Chester County, Pennsylvania. The original house was built in two sections about 1750 and in 1761. The original section is a two-story rectangular stuccoed stone structure with a kitchen wing. In 1904, Philadelphia architect Milton Bennett Medary (1874–1929) rehabilitated the house to add diamond-paned dormer windows and a porch. Also on the property are a contributing stone barn, garage, and outbuildings.

It was listed on the National Register of Historic Places in 1984.

References

Houses on the National Register of Historic Places in Pennsylvania
Houses completed in 1761
Houses in Chester County, Pennsylvania
National Register of Historic Places in Chester County, Pennsylvania
1750 establishments in Pennsylvania